Shireen Akbar MBE (30 July 1944 – 7 March 1997) was an educationist and an artist. She is well known for her contributions to the education and general social upliftment of South Asian women in England. She was appointed MBE on 14 June 1996 for her contributions to arts and community education.

Early life 
Shireen Nisat Akbar was born to a wealthy Bengali Muslim family in Calcutta on 30 July 1944. In 1957, the family moved to Dhaka (in present-day Bangladesh) where she completed her Masters before taking up a job as a teacher at the University of Dhaka. In 1968, she left for England to study English at New Hall, Cambridge. After graduating in 1970, she went on to receive a teaching qualification in primary education from Cambridge Institute of Education.

Following the completion of her education, she was employed by the Inner London Education Authority (ILEA) in 1978 as a youth social worker, a tutor and an interpreter to Bengali girls and young women in Tower Hamlets.

Work

References 

1944 births
1997 deaths
Alumni of New Hall, Cambridge
University of Dhaka alumni
20th-century British women artists
Academic staff of the University of Dhaka
Bangladeshi emigrants to the United Kingdom
Artists from Kolkata
Members of the Order of the British Empire